The Department of Aviation was an Australian government department that existed between May 1982 and July 1987.

The Department of Aviation was announced by Prime Minister Malcolm Fraser as a new agency in 1982. At the time Mr Fraser said that "the re-establishment of an Aviation Department recognises the importance of civil aviation to the economy and to the community at large. It is a distinct area which presents  particular issues of its own and its importance warrants individual ministerial attention."

Scope
Information about the department's functions and/or government funding allocation could be found in the Administrative Arrangements Orders, the annual Portfolio Budget Statements and in the department's annual reports.

The department was responsible for civil and air navigation functions, inherited from the Department of Transport (III).

Structure
The department was an Australian Public Service department, staffed by officials who were responsible to the Minister for Aviation.

References

Ministries established in 1982
Aviation
1982 establishments in Australia
1987 disestablishments in Australia